On 13 March 2020, because of the global coronavirus outbreak, the government called a "national red code alert" and banned flights to Spain, Italy, France, Austria, Belgium, Czech Republic, Cyprus, Germany, Ireland, the U.K., Poland, Portugal and Romania.

On 17 March 2020, Parliament declared a state of emergency for at least 60 days, and suspended all international flights.

Pre-2020 service
Until the coronavirus outbreak, Air Moldova served the following destinations:

References

Lists of airline destinations